Chenareh-ye Olya (also Romanized as Chenāreh-ye ‘Olyā; also known as Chenāreh-ye Bālā and Chenāreh) is a village in Yusefvand Rural District, in the Central District of Selseleh County, Lorestan Province, Iran. At the 2006 census, its population was 222, in 49 families.

References 

Towns and villages in Selseleh County